The siege of Mirandola may refer to:

Siege of Mirandola (1321), by Francesco Bonaccolsi (son of Passerino Bonaccolsi)
Siege of Mirandola (1355), by the Visconti of Milan
Siege of Mirandola (1502), by Ludovico Pico and Francesco I Pico, with Ercole I d'Este and Francesco Gonzaga
Siege of Mirandola (1511), by Pope Julius II
Siege of Mirandola (1517), by Camillo Trivulzio
Siege of Mirandola (1536), by Imperial army
Siege of Mirandola (1551), by army of Pope Julius III
Siege of Mirandola (1705), by French army (part of War of the Spanish Succession)
Siege of Mirandola (1734), by French army (part of War of the Polish Succession)
Siege of Mirandola (1735), by Spanish army (part of War of the Polish Succession)
Siege of Mirandola (1742), by Austro-Sardinian army (part of War of the Austrian Succession)
Siege of Mirandola (1796), by Napoleon
Siege of Mirandola (1799), by Mantuans